The Central Florida Zoo and Botanical Gardens is a  zoo and botanical garden located north of Orlando, Florida in Sanford. As a not-for-profit organization, it is a leader in conservation, providing experiences that inspire actions on behalf of wildlife. The Zoo has been an accredited member of the Association of Zoos and Aquariums (AZA) since 1986.

History

In 1923, the Central Florida Zoo (then called the Sanford Municipal Zoo) opened its gates for the first time with only a small collection of animals that were donated by the local fire department. In 1941, it was relocated to new facilities where Sanford City Hall now stands. It was moved to its current location on July 4, 1975.

With the support from a group of dedicated citizens, and the donation of a 106-acre piece of land from Seminole County, the Central Florida Zoological Park opened at its current location along Lake Monroe, with Jack Hanna as Director. In 1986 the Central Florida Zoo became accredited by the Association of Zoos and Aquariums (AZA). In 2005, The Wayne M. Densch Discovery Center and ZooLab opened. The buildings feature classroom and hands-on instructional space, as well as a multi-purpose banquet room available for private meeting and event rentals. In 2007, the Zoo officially announced its botanical garden status and became the Central Florida Zoo and Botanical Gardens. The same year, the Wharton-Smith Tropical Splash Ground opened.

The zoo closed for over 3 weeks due to Hurricane Ian.

Animals

The Zoo is now home to over 350 animals, representing over 100 species. Guests can take advantage of educational opportunities including keeper chats and animal encounters.

Mammals at the Zoo include black-handed spider monkey, cheetah, clouded leopard, goat, Hoffmann's two-toed sloth, llama, alpaca, lesser spot-nosed guenon, river otter, puma, red ruffed lemur, South African crested porcupine, warthog, Indian rhino, giraffe, fossa, Amur leopard, and more.

Birds at the Zoo include African red-billed hornbill, bald eagle, black-throated magpie-jay, blue-bellied roller, green-winged macaw, guira cuckoo, kookaburra, Palawan peacock-pheasant, Panama yellow-crowned amazon, silvery-cheeked hornbill, spotted thick-knee, wreathed hornbill, violaceous turaco.

Reptiles at the Zoo include Aldabra giant tortoise, American alligator, American crocodile, Aruba Island rattlesnake, black-breasted leaf turtle, black caiman, dusky pygmy rattlesnake, eastern green mamba, eastern coral snake, eastern diamondback rattlesnake, eastern hognose, Egyptian cobra, eyelash viper, Florida cottonmouth, Florida pine snake, Gila monster, Grand Cayman Island rock iguana, green tree python, jungle carpet python, king cobra, long-nosed viper, Madagascar tree boa, Neuwied's lancehead snake, New Caledonian giant gecko, New Guinea crocodile monitor, prehensile-tailed skink, red rat snake, red spitting cobra, scarlet kingsnake, southern copperhead, tiger viper, timber rattlesnake, and West African mamba.

Attractions
Within the zoo, a small carousel and splash park can be found. Giraffe feedings and rhino encounters are available for an extra cost. The Little Florida Railroad, a  gauge ridable miniature railway with a G-16 streamliner locomotive originally built in 1951, began operating at the zoo in 2003. Following an incident in November 2019 in which a derailment required guests to be hospitalized, the train was closed indefinitely.

Events
The Zoo hosts several annual events, including ZOO Boo Bash and Hippity Hop Adventure. Brews Around the Zoo, a 21 & up only event occurs yearly in the spring. In 2019, the Inaugural Asian Lantern Festival: Into the Wild, was held at the Central Florida Zoo. In partnership with Tianyu Arts & Culture, 35 hand crafted illuminated lantern elements transformed the Zoo and more than 38,000 guests took part in the event.

Conservation
The Central Florida Zoo has teamed up with The Florida Fish and Wildlife Conservation Commission's Fish and Wildlife Research Institute (FWC/FWRI) and the Florida Museum of Natural History to monitor the state's 68 species of amphibians and help save the 16 species considered to be at greatest risk due to habitat loss, invasive species, climate change, and new wildlife diseases. The Zoo also participates in several AZA Species Survival Plans (SSP), including those for the cheetah, ruffed lemur, Amur leopard, guenon, spider monkey, cotton-top tamarin, rock iguana, and clouded leopard.

The Zoo also operates an offsite conservation center, the Orianne Center for Indigo Conservation. This facility helps to breed and release eastern indigo snakes into the wild where they have disappeared.

See also

Gatorland

Notes

References

External links

Zoos established in 1923
Zoos in Florida
Buildings and structures in Seminole County, Florida
Sanford, Florida
Tourist attractions in Seminole County, Florida
1923 establishments in Florida